Jenny Hill may refer to:

 Jenny Hill (journalist), BBC News reporter and presenter
 Jenny Hill (music hall performer) (1848–1896), British music hall performer
 Jenny Hill (politician), mayor of the City of Townsville, Queensland, Australia
 Jenny Hill (judoka) (born 1972), Australian Olympic judoka, member of the Hill family
 Jenny Hill (musician), British double bass player, composer and producer

See also
Jenni Hill (artist), Australian artist in the Progressive Art Movement in Adelaide in the 1970s